Misty Dawn: Portrait of a Muse is a 2008 photography book by Jock Sturges. It comprises 100 duotone images of model Misty Dawn taken over a period of 25 years. Photos are arranged in chronological order starting from when she was 4 years old. Many images feature other models posing with Dawn, and images range from fully clothed to full nudity. Most photographs were taken in Northern California; some were taken in Montalivet, France. Many of the images appear in Sturges' earlier books, including Radiant Identities (1994), though many others were previously unpublished.

Reception
Whilst praising Sturges' talent and images, Christian Perring questioned what the book was trying to accomplish, stating: "The subtitle of the book is 'Portrait of a Muse,' but as a portrait, it is extremely one dimensional (...) If [Sturges' goal] is just presenting us with striking pictures of attractive nude young women set against a backdrop of nature, he is very successful. However, if he is trying to do more, and tell us something about life, and people, then his work is far more limited in its success."

References

External links

2008 non-fiction books
Books of nude photography